Zubeiru or Zubayru bi Adama (died 1903) was a ruler of the Adamawa Emirate founded by his father, Modibo Adama. By the time he came to the throne in 1890, the emirate was threatened by the Germans, French and English. Zubeiru attempted "a hopeless, though spirited, rearguard action" against European attrition of the emirate.

Life
His rule was weakened by war against Hayatu ibn Sa'id and then attempts to resist the Royal Niger Company and British administration under Frederick Lugard. In 1901 he was forced to flee Yola and become an exiled renegade.

References

Cameroonian traditional rulers
Nigerian traditional rulers
African slave traders
19th-century births
Year of birth unknown
1903 deaths
19th-century African businesspeople